Karjalan Maa was a regional newspaper published in Joensuu, Finland, between 1918 and 28 April 2011. It was the organ and the last provincial paper of the Center Party.

History and profile
Karjalan Maa was established in March 1917. Its first issue was published in 1918 with title Korpi-Jaakko. The paper had its headquarters in Joensuu. It was published by Maakunnan Kustannus Oy three times a week until April 2010 when it began to be published once a week.

Karjalan Maa was one of the newspapers owned by the Center Party. The other one is Suomenmaa. Pekka Puustinen served as the editor-in-chief of Karjalan Maa which ceased publication on 28 April 2011.

References

1917 establishments in Finland
2011 disestablishments in Finland
Defunct newspapers published in Finland
Defunct weekly newspapers
Finnish-language newspapers
Mass media in Joensuu
Publications established in 1917
Publications disestablished in 2011
Weekly newspapers published in Finland